The 2020–21 Cleveland Cavaliers season was the 51st season of the franchise in the National Basketball Association (NBA). They did not make it to the playoffs for the third season in a row.

Draft

Before the start of the 2020 NBA draft period, the Cavaliers' selection was originally held as the #3 selection due to them finishing their previous season with the third worst record in the NBA (only ahead of the Minnesota Timberwolves and Golden State Warriors) before the NBA suspended their season on March 12 and eventually cancelled Cleveland's season on June 5. Like Minnesota and Golden State, Cleveland held the best odds to jump up to the #1 pick in the 2020 NBA draft lottery, though the Cavaliers could have fallen as low as the #6 pick. However, unlike Minnesota and Golden State, Cleveland did not stay in the top 3; their first-round pick instead dropped down to the fifth selection of the draft. The Cavaliers didn't have a second round selection.

Trades
On January 13, 2021, the Cavaliers were part of a blockbuster four team trade.  As part of the deal which was headlined by James Harden going to the Brooklyn Nets, the Cavs received center Jarrett Allen and forward Taurean Prince from Brooklyn, while sending guard Dante Exum and a 2022 first round draft pick to the Houston Rockets.

On January 22, 2021, the Cavaliers traded disgruntled small forward Kevin Porter Jr. to the Rockets for a highly-protected future second-round pick.

Roster

Standings

Division

Conference

Notes
 z – Clinched home court advantage for the entire playoffs
 c – Clinched home court advantage for the conference playoffs
 y – Clinched division title
 x – Clinched playoff spot
 pb – Clinched play-in spot
 o – Eliminated from playoff contention
 * – Division leader

Transactions

Trades

Free agency

Re-signed

Additions

Subtractions

Notes

References

Cleveland Cavaliers seasons
Cleveland
Cleveland Cavaliers
Cleveland Cavaliers